The 2023 Tenerife Challenger was a professional tennis tournament played on hard courts. It was the second edition of the tournament which was part of the 2023 ATP Challenger Tour. It took place in Tenerife, Spain between 16 and 22 January 2023.

Singles main-draw entrants

Seeds

 1 Rankings are as of 9 January 2023.

Other entrants
The following players received wildcards into the singles main draw:
  Matteo Gigante
  Alejandro Moro Cañas
  Nikolás Sánchez Izquierdo

The following players received entry from the qualifying draw:
  Ulises Blanch
  Lucas Gerch
  Lorenzo Giustino
  Ernests Gulbis
  Lukas Neumayer
  Máté Valkusz

Champions

Singles

 Alexander Shevchenko def.  Sebastian Ofner 7–5, 6–2.

Doubles

 Victor Vlad Cornea /  Sergio Martos Gornés def.  Patrik Niklas-Salminen /  Bart Stevens 6–3, 6–4.

References

2023 ATP Challenger Tour
2023 in Spanish tennis
January 2023 sports events in Spain
2023